Corytophanes is a genus of Neotropical lizards, commonly referred to as helmeted iguanas or helmeted basilisks, in the family Corytophanidae. The genus contains three species, all of which are arboreal, and reside in tropical forests.

Species
These species are recognized as being valid:

Nota bene: A binomial authority in parentheses indicates that the species was originally described in a genus other than Corytophanes.

Etymology
The specific name, hernandesii, is in honor of Spanish naturalist Francisco Hernández (1514-1587).

References

Further reading
Schlegel H (1826). "Herpetologische Nachrichten ". Isis von Oken 20 (3): 281-294. (Corytophanes, new genus, p. 290). (in German),

Corytophanes
Lizard genera
Taxa named by Heinrich Boie